In a diode model two diodes are connected back-to-back to make a PNP or NPN bipolar junction transistor (BJT) equivalent.  This model is theoretical and qualitative.

Examples

PNP transistor
To make a PNP transistor, the cathodes of both diodes are back-to-back connected to form a large N type base region.

NPN transistor
To make an NPN transistor, the anodes of both diodes are back-to-back connected to form a large P type base region.

Base biasing
As the base region is a combination of two anodes or two cathodes, and is not lightly doped, more base biasing is required for making this model operational.

References

External links
 https://en.wikiversity.org/wiki/Electronic_Circuits/Introduction_to_the_simple_diode_npn_model
 https://www.st-andrews.ac.uk/~www_pa/Scots_Guide/info/comp/active/BiPolar/dtob.gif

Transistor modeling